is a Japanese instructor of Shotokan karate.
He has won the JKA's version of the world championships for kumite.
He is currently an instructor of the Japan Karate Association.

Biography
He studied at Taisho University.

Competition
Rikiya Iimura has had success in karate competition.

Major Tournament Success
12th Funakoshi Gichin Cup World Karate-do Championship Tournament (Pattaya, 2011) - 1st Place Kumite
54th JKA All Japan Karate Championship (2011) - 3rd Place Kumite

References

 

Japanese male karateka
Karate coaches
Shotokan practitioners
Sportspeople from Ibaraki Prefecture
Living people
Year of birth missing (living people)
21st-century Japanese people